A mine-clearing line charge  (abbreviated MCLC or MICLIC; pronounced  or "mick-lick") is a device used to create a breach in minefields under combat conditions. While there are many types, the basic design is for many explosive charges connected on a line to be projected onto the minefield and then exploded, detonating any buried mines, thus clearing a path for troops to cross.

The system may either be human-portable or vehicle-mounted. Man-portable MCLCs are primarily used to clear smaller paths for dismounted infantry while the larger vehicle mounted are used to clear paths for combat vehicles. The systems do not guarantee clearance of all types of mines.

History 
The British and Commonwealth developed their systems during the Second World War. The Canadians developed "Snake", an oversized application of the Bangalore torpedo in 1941 to 1942. A more flexible development was "Conger", developed in 1944, a tube that could be fired across the minefield and then filled with explosive before detonation.

Conger was a 2-inch (51 mm) woven hose launched by a five-inch (127 mm) rocket. The tube and rocket were mounted in a Universal Carrier which had been stripped out to reduce it down to an armoured tracked trailer that could be towed by a tank, often a Churchill AVRE. The rocket was fired, trailing the hose across the area to be cleared. Compressed air was then used to pump the liquid explosive - just over a ton of "822C" nitroglycerin - into the hose before it was detonated. Conger was used in Normandy where there were instances of premature detonation.

In the postwar period the British introduced Giant Viper.

In 1991, during the First Gulf War (aka the Persian Gulf War) MICLICs, such as the Giant Viper, consisted of rocket launched lines containing roughly 800 kilograms of explosives, stretching some 100 meters long. These MICLICs were used by Coalition forces to penetrate extensive Iraqi minefield along the Saudi-Kuwait border.

During the South African Border War, South African forces employed the use of the Plofadder system to clear paths through Angolan and Cuban minefields.

Current use 

Both are large, heavy systems that are deployed in a vehicle-towed trailer.

The US Army also uses the Antipersonnel Obstacle Breaching System, which clears a path 0.6 to 1.0 meters by 45 meters, and is light enough to be carried by two soldiers.

The have been reports of Russian and Syrian forces using their UR-77 Meteorit MICLIC systems as offensive weapons, to destroy buildings during urban fighting.

Countermeasures
Some modern mines, such as the Italian SB-33 mine, have a fuze mechanism that detonates the mine if subject to gradual, steady pressure, but locks the fuze if subject to a sudden shock. Such mines are resistant to clearing by line charges.

Examples
 M58 MICLIC (MIne Clearing LIne Charge) vehicle
 Antipersonnel Obstacle Breaching System (APOBS)
 Python Minefield Breaching System
 Charge Line Mine Clearing (Vehicle) - Indian
 UR-77 (УР-77) Soviet Meteorit Mineclearing System (rocket launched explosive hose), replacement of the UR-67 system based on the BTR-50PK chassis.
Turkish MKE TAMGEÇ and MKE TAMKAR. Tracked with FNSS ACV-15 mounted on trailer.

See also
 Bangalore torpedo
 Canadian pipe mine

References 

Bibliography

External links

Mine warfare countermeasures
English inventions